Charles Ernest Kauhane (June 14, 1905 – September 5, 1982) was an American politician.

Born in Honolulu, Hawaii, Kauhane graduated from St. Louis University. He worked for the sheriff and police departments for the city and county of Honolulu. He also served as a court bailiff. From 1942 to 1956, Kauhane served in the Hawaii Territorial House of Representatives and was a Democrat. In 1955, Kauhane served as speaker of the Hawaii Territorial House of Representatives. He also served in the Hawaii Constitutional Convention of 1950. In 1959, Kauhane served in the Hawaii House of Representatives and was the majority floor leader. He also served in the Hawaii Constitutional Convention of 1968 and joined the Republican Party.

Notes

1905 births
1982 deaths
Politicians from Honolulu
Saint Louis University alumni
Hawaii Democrats
Hawaii Republicans
Members of the Hawaii Territorial Legislature
20th-century American politicians
Members of the Hawaii House of Representatives